A cheat is someone who engages in cheating.

Cheat may also refer to:

Places
 Cheat River, a tributary of the Monongahela River in West Virginia, the United States
 Cheat Lake, a reservoir on the Cheat River
 Cheat Mountain, one of the highest mountains in the Alleghenies

Games or gaming
 Cheat (game), a card game
 A cheat code, a hidden means of gaining an advantage in a computer or video game
 Cheat, an alternate term for defection in the prisoner's dilemma in game theory

Film and TV
 The Cheat (1912 film), an Australian silent film directed by Alfred Rolfe
 The Cheat (1915 film), a Cecil B. DeMille film
 The Cheat (1923 film), a silent film produced by Famous Players-Lasky 
 The Cheat (1931 film), a remake of the 1915 film starring Tallulah Bankhead
 The Cheat (1937 film), a French drama film
 Cheats (film), a 2002 comedy film starring Matthew Lawrence and Mary Tyler Moore
 The Cheat, a character from Homestar Runner
 Cheat!,  a television show on the G4 network
 Cheat,  a 2019 television series starring Katherine Kelly and Molly Windsor

Music
 "Cheat", a song by The Clash from the UK version of their album The Clash
 Cheats (band), a Filipino band

Other uses
 Cheat lines, decorative, horizontal, single or multiple, bands of color applied to both sides of an aircraft's fuselage
 Cheat sheet, cheatsheet, or crib sheet, a concise set of notes used for quick reference
 Drooping Brome, a European grass sometimes called "cheat"

See also 
 Cheetah (disambiguation)
 Cheater (disambiguation)
 Cheating (disambiguation)